Nicolas Angel Siragusa (born May 10, 1994) is a former American football offensive guard. He played college football at San Diego State, and was drafted by the Baltimore Ravens in the fourth round of the 2017 NFL Draft.

High school career
A native of San Diego, Siragusa attended Mater Dei High School in Chula Vista, California, where he only played two years of varsity football after playing baseball and basketball during his freshman and second years.

Regarded as a three-star recruit by ESPN, Siragusa was ranked as the No. 102 offensive tackle in a 2012 class highlighted by D. J. Humphries and Andrus Peat. Siragusa committed to his home-town San Diego State Aztecs over offers from Fresno State, New Mexico State, San José State, and others.

College career
Siragusa was a four-year starter at San Diego State. On November 14, 2016, it was announced that Siragusa had accepted an invitation to appear in the 2017 Senior Bowl. He attended the Senior Bowl, but suffered a thumb injury on the first day of practice that sidelined him for the rest of the week and the Reese's Senior Bowl game.

Professional career

Baltimore Ravens
The Baltimore Ravens selected Siragusa in the fourth round (122nd overall) of the 2017 NFL Draft. He was the sixth guard and eighth interior offensive lineman, as well as one of three San Diego State products (along with Donnel Pumphrey and Damontae Kazee) selected in 2017.

On May 5, 2017, the Baltimore Ravens signed Siragusa to a four-year, $3.02 million contract, including a $628,379 signing bonus. However, during a training camp practice on August 1, Siragusa tore his ACL, MCL, and PCL. He was placed on injured reserve on September 1, 2017, ending his rookie season before it began.

On September 1, 2018, the Ravens waived Siragusa during final roster cuts and resigned him to the practice squad the next day.

Green Bay Packers
On December 12, 2018, the Green Bay Packers signed Siragusa off the Ravens' practice squad and added him to their active roster after placing Byron Bell on injured reserve. He was waived on April 29, 2019.

Indianapolis Colts
On June 4, 2019, Siragusa signed with the Indianapolis Colts. He was waived on July 24, 2019.

Buffalo Bills
On August 1, 2019, Siragusa signed with the Buffalo Bills, but was waived nine days later.

Los Angeles Wildcats
Siragusa was drafted in the 6th round in phase two in the 2020 XFL Draft by the Los Angeles Wildcats. He had his contract terminated when the league suspended operations on April 10, 2020.

Personal life
Despite his surname and the team that drafted him, Nico is not related to former Ravens defensive tackle Tony Siragusa. His parents are Ramon and Dianne Siragusa.

References

External links

San Diego State Aztecs bio

1994 births
Living people
Sportspeople from Chula Vista, California
Players of American football from San Diego
American football offensive guards
San Diego State Aztecs football players
Baltimore Ravens players
Green Bay Packers players
Indianapolis Colts players
Buffalo Bills players
Los Angeles Wildcats (XFL) players